Mu'tah  is a town in Karak Governorate in Jordan. Mutah University is located in the city.

History
In Islamic tradition, it is known for the Battle of Mu'tah in 629 CE, the first military engagement between the Arab Muslims under Muhammad and the Byzantine Empire. Mausolea were built nearby for some of those fallen in said battle, namely Ja'far ibn Abi Talib, 'Abd Allah ibn Rawahah, and Zayd ibn Harithah.

In 1596 it appeared in the Ottoman tax registers named as Muta, situated in the nahiya (subdistrict) of Karak, part of the Sanjak of Ajlun. It had 14 households; all Muslim. The villagers paid a fixed tax-rate of 25% on agricultural products; including wheat, barley, summer crops, olive trees/vineyards/fruit trees, goats and bee-hives; in addition to occasional revenues. The total tax was 6,000 akçe.

See also
 Levant
 Sahaba

References

Bibliography

 

Populated places in Karak Governorate